José Gilbert Gómez (born 22 June 1991) is a Panamanian tennis player.

Gómez has a career high ATP doubles ranking of 942 achieved on 16 June 2014.

Gómez appeared in the 2017 Visit Panamá Cup as a wildcard.

Gómez represents Panama at the Davis Cup where he has a W/L record of 1–14.

References

External links

1991 births
Living people
Panamanian male tennis players
20th-century Panamanian people
21st-century Panamanian people